In robotics, a robotic paradigm is a mental model of how a robot operates.  A robotic paradigm can be described by the relationship between the three basic elements of robotics: Sensing, Planning, and Acting. It can also be described by how sensory data is processed and distributed through the system, and where decisions are made.

Hierarchical/deliberative paradigm
 The robot operates in a top-down fashion, heavy on planning.
 The robot senses the world, plans the next action, acts; at each step the robot explicitly plans the next move.
 All the sensing data tends to be gathered into one global world model.

The reactive paradigm

 Sense-act type of organization.
 The robot has multiple instances of Sense-Act couplings.
 These couplings are concurrent processes, called behaviours, which take the local sensing data and compute the best action to take independently of what the other processes are doing.
 The robot will do a combination of behaviours.

Hybrid deliberate/reactive paradigm
 The robot first plans (deliberates) how to best decompose a task into subtasks (also called “mission planning”) and then what are the suitable behaviours to accomplish each subtask.
 Then the behaviours starts executing as per the Reactive Paradigm.
 Sensing organization is also a mixture of Hierarchical and Reactive styles; sensor data gets routed to each behaviour that needs that sensor, but is also available to the planner for construction of a task-oriented global world model.

See also
 Behavior-based robotics
 Hierarchical control system
 Subsumption architecture

References 
 Asada, H. & Slotine, J.-J. E. (1986). Robot Analysis and Control. Wiley. .
 Arkin, Ronald C. (1998). Behavior-Based Robotics. MIT Press. .